"I Love You" is a 1995 single by American singer-songwriter Mary J. Blige, taken from her second album My Life.

Background
"I Love You" was included as a B-side on the standard cassette release of Blige's single "You Bring Me Joy". It charted as a double A-side with "You Bring Me Joy" on the U.S. Hot 100 and Hot R&B/Hip-Hop songs charts.

There were plans and negotiations of a possible music video for this single to be shot back-to-back with "You Bring Me Joy", but plans were scrapped as it performed well on its own. I Love You (Part 2) was recorded with rapper duo Smif-n-Wessun. The song samples the piano loop of Isaac Hayes's "Ike's Mood" from 1970's album "...To Be Continued", and samples "Hollywood's World" by DJ Hollywood.

Chart performance

Other recordings
I Love You (Part 3) was later recorded by Keyshia Cole. On Cole's version, rapper Lil' Wayne is featured.

References 

1995 singles
Mary J. Blige songs
Songs written by Mary J. Blige
Songs written by Sean Combs
Songs written by Isaac Hayes
Uptown Records singles
1994 songs
Contemporary R&B ballads
Soul ballads
1990s ballads